Anatoly Genrikhovich Naiman (23 April 1936 – 21 January 2022) was a Russian poet, translator and writer. He was one of the four Akhmatova's Orphans.

Biography
Born on 23 April 1936 in Leningrad, Naiman was a graduate of the Leningrad Technological Institute  and was a fellow at Oxford University and the Kennan Institute of the Woodrow Wilson Center.

He died in Moscow on 21 January 2022, at the age of 85. He suffered a stroke few days prior to his death.

Career
Naiman began writing poetry in 1954. As a translator of poetry, he had been published since 1959. In the late 1950s and early 1960s in Leningrad, he published several stories and poems under pseudonyms. Until 1989, his translations were mainly printed in the USSR. 

In 1970, he wrote poems for the songs of the children's film "The Amazing Boy" (directed by Alexander Orlov), which were performed by Alla Pugacheva.

Notable works

Translations
Flamence (1983)
Songs of the French Troubadors (1987)

Original Poetry
Clouds at the End of the Century (1993)
The Rhythm of a Hand (2000)
Lions and Acrobats: Selected poetry of Anatoly Naiman, translated by Margo Shohl Rosen & F. D. Reeve (2005)

Novels
Sir (2001)
Kablukov (2005)

References

1936 births
2022 deaths
Russian male novelists
Writers from Saint Petersburg
Saint Petersburg State Institute of Technology alumni
Russian male poets
Soviet Jews
Russian Jews
Soviet novelists
Soviet male poets
Saint Peter's School (Saint Petersburg) alumni